The women's sprint competition at the 2006 Asian Games was held from 11 to 13 December at the Aspire Hall 1. Guo Shuang won the gold medal.

Schedule
All times are Arabia Standard Time (UTC+03:00)

Records

Results
Legend
DNS — Did not start

Qualifying

Quarterfinals

Heat 1

Heat 2

Heat 3

Heat 4

Race for 5th–8th places

Semifinals

Heat 1

Heat 2

Finals

Bronze

Gold

Final standing

References

External links 
Results

Track Women sprint